The 2021–22 Kansas Jayhawks women's basketball team represented the University of Kansas in the 2021–22 NCAA Division I women's basketball season. The Jayhawks were led by seventh-year head coach Brandon Schneider. They played their home games at Allen Fieldhouse in Lawrence, Kansas as members of the Big 12 Conference. Kansas made the 2022 NCAA tournament, their first since 2013, losing in the second round to Stanford.

Previous season
The Jayhawks finished the season 7–18, 3–15 in Big 12 play to finish in a tie for ninth place. As the ninth seed in the Big 12 Tournament, they lost to TCU in the First Round. They were not invited to the NCAA tournament or the WNIT.

Roster

Schedule and results 
Source:

|-
!colspan=6 style=| Non-conference regular season

|-
!colspan=6 style=| Big 12 regular season

|-
!colspan=6 style=| Big 12 Tournament

|-
!colspan=6 style=| NCAA Women's Tournament

See also 
 2021–22 Kansas Jayhawks men's basketball team

References 

Kansas Jayhawks women's basketball seasons
Kansas
Kansas Jayhawks women's basketball
Kansas Jayhawks women's basketball
Kansas